Vladimir Rosin (born 11 April 1932) is a Soviet wrestler. He competed in the men's Greco-Roman lightweight at the 1956 Summer Olympics.

References

External links
 

1932 births
Living people
Soviet male sport wrestlers
Olympic wrestlers of the Soviet Union
Wrestlers at the 1956 Summer Olympics
Place of birth missing (living people)